Tinadendron noumeanum is a species of plant in the family Rubiaceae. It is endemic to New Caledonia.

References

Guettardeae
Endemic flora of New Caledonia
Vulnerable plants
Taxonomy articles created by Polbot
Taxa named by Henri Ernest Baillon